Lost is a 2023 Indian Hindi-language Thriller film directed by Aniruddha Roy Chowdhury and produced by Zee Studios along with Namah Pictures. The film stars Yami Gautam in the lead with Pankaj Kapur, Rahul Khanna, Neil Bhoopalam, Pia Bajpiee. Honeyy Jain & Tushar Pandey stars as in supporting roles. The film was released on February 16, 2023, on ZEE5. The film had its world premiere at the Chicago South Asian Film Festival on September 22, 2022. It had its Asian premiere at the 53rd International Film Festival of India, Goa.

Plot 
Inspired by true events, Lost charts the story of a young woman crime reporter who is working on a story of sudden disappearance of a young theatre activist. The layered story aims to represent the idea of lost values and integrity.

Cast 
Yami Gautam as Vidhi Sahani
Pankaj Kapur as Nanu
Rahul Khanna as Ranjan Varman
Neil Bhoopalam as Jeet
Pia Bajpiee as Ankita Chauhan
Tushar Pandey as Ishan Bharti
 Akshay Kapoor as Aman Yadav
 Honeyy Jain as Namita

Production 
The shoot of the film started soon in July 2021 in Kolkata. The shoots were wrapped by end of August 2021.

Film Festivals 
Lost received a standing ovation at the Chicago South Asian Film Festival, where it premiered. Subsequently, it was selected as the closing film of Atlanta Indian Film Festival.

Critical Reception 
Firstpost in its review states, "The real hero of Lost is the city of Kolkata. It has never looked more vibrant and mysterious in any Hindi films since Sujoy Ghosh’s Kahaani." Rating it 3 out of 5, India Today commented, "Lost might not be your easy breezy watch for the weekend, but it sure would make you think.' Times Now called Lost an "ode to 'lost' art of investigative journalism."

Music 

The music for the film composed by Shantanu Moitra. Lyrics are written by Swanand Kirkire.

References

External links 
 
 Lost on ZEE5

Indian thriller films
2020s Hindi-language films